is a Japanese light novel series written by Inori and illustrated by Hanagata. It was serialized online between January 2018 and February 2021 on the user-generated novel publishing website Shōsetsuka ni Narō. It was acquired by Aichu Publishing, who published the first light novel volume digitally in February 2019 under their GL Bunko imprint.

A manga adaptation with art by Anoshimo has been serialized in Ichijinsha's yuri manga magazine Comic Yuri Hime since June 18, 2020. It has been collected into two tankōbon volumes. The light novel and manga have been licensed in North America by Seven Seas Entertainment. An anime television series adaptation by Platinum Vision is set to premiere in 2023.

Plot
Oohashi Rei, an ordinary office worker, is overworked to death and suddenly finds herself reincarnated as Rae Taylor, the heroine of her favorite otome game, Revolution. However, Rae has no interest in the game's three original romance routes with the Bauer Kingdom's princes. Instead, she sets her heart on Claire François, the game's main antagonist. Using her knowledge of the game's events that are yet to come, Rae tries to give Claire a happy ending before the coming revolution destroys any chance of it happening.

Characters

The main protagonist, previously known as Oohashi Rei before she died of overwork and reincarnated as the player character of her favorite otome game, Revolution. As she's gay, Rae has no interest in the game’s capture targets; in fact, she becomes vexed when they pay attention to her. Instead, she aims to give Claire François a happy ending; falling in love with her. At the end, the two get married and adopt twin daughters.

The "villainess" of the original game and current target of Rae's affection. Claire is a noble who believes in the current aristocratic system within the kingdom and often has a low view on commoners, especially Rae. This only serves to make her flustered and confused by Rae's interest in her. At the end of the story, Claire and Rae are married and working as teachers.

The eldest heir within the Bauer Kingdom's royal family and first in line to the throne. He is an energetic young man who becomes interested in Rae, much to her dismay. Rod is the most popular capture target within the game.

The second heir within the Bauer Kingdom's royal family. Thane is often stoic and feels his abilities are inferior to his brothers, giving him a complex about it. Thane is considered as the least popular capture target within the game.

The third heir within the Bauer Kingdom's royal family. A charismatic and attractive prince type who uses charm to mask a cunning mind. Yu is the second most popular capture target within the game.

Rae's roommate and best friend. Her family was once a noble house, but they become commoners after falling from grace and becoming impoverished. She almost realized Rae is not her old friend anymore; since the other Rei woke up in her, Misha believes something is wrong with her head.

Media

Light novels
I'm in Love with the Villainess was originally serialized online from January 14, 2018 to February 21, 2021 on the user-generated novel publishing website Shōsetsuka ni Narō.

Five volumes of the official light novel were published digitally by Aichu Publishing under their GL Bunko imprint from February 26, 2019 to August 26, 2021. The light novels featured cover art and additional illustrations by Hanagata. In 2021, Ichijinsha announced that it would begin publishing the light novels in paperback, with the first volume released on December 18, 2021 under their Ichijinsha Novels imprint. In April 2020, Seven Seas Entertainment announced that they had licensed the light novel in North America. On March 19, 2021, Seven Seas issued a statement that they would be releasing a new version of volume one due to the localization decisions in the original omitting several paragraphs.

Spin-off
She’s so Cheeky for a Commoner! is a retelling of the original series from Claire François' perspective. It began serialization online on May 25, 2021 on Shōsetsuka ni Narō. Aichu Publishing published the first light novel volume digitally under their GL Bunko imprint on February 28, 2022, with Hanagata returning for cover design and additional illustrations. At Anime Expo 2022, Seven Seas Entertainment announced that they licensed the spin-off for English publication.

Manga
A manga adaptation is written by Inori and illustrated by Anoshimo. It began serialization in Ichijinsha's yuri manga magazine Comic Yuri Hime on June 18, 2020. In February 2021, Seven Seas Entertainment announced that they had also licensed the manga adaptation.

Anime
An anime television series adaptation was announced on December 13, 2022. It will be produced by Platinum Vision and directed by Hideaki Ōba, with scripts written by Ayumu Hisao, character designs handled by Yōko Satō, and music composed by Noriyuki Asakura and Usagi to Uma. The series is set to premiere in 2023.

Reception
In Anime News Network's Fall 2020 Light Novel Guide the series was generally received positively, though not as strongly as other yuri titles released at the time. However, it was noted that "if Rae and Claire both start off as almost intensely difficult to like, they do undergo enough of a change by about midway through the novel that makes them much easier to root for."

Others had more positive reception to the series. Erica Friedman, the founder of Yuricon, awarded the first light novel an overall score of nine. Friedman also praised the series for its frank discussion of LGBT identity, writing "And then you hit a moment when Misha, Rae’s best friend, roommate and foil, turns to Rae and asks, 'Are you gay?'…and the characters have a frank discussion about sexuality." Nicki Bauman noted that the series open focus on LGBT themes in its characters and storytelling was not typical of the yuri genre and proposed that it might signal change in yuri themes and stories.

In March 2021, I'm in Love with the Villainess placed 5th in AnimeJapan's annual Manga We Want to See Animated Ranking. In June 2021, the series was nominated for the Best Printed Manga category in the Next Manga Awards and placed 17th out of 50 nominees. It was also nominated for the same award and placed 8th out of 50 nominees in 2022.

References

External links
 Official English light novel website
 Official anime website 
 

2010s LGBT literature
2019 Japanese novels
2022 Japanese novels
2023 anime television series debuts
Anime and manga based on light novels
Fiction about reincarnation
Ichijinsha manga
Isekai anime and manga
Isekai novels and light novels
LGBT in anime and manga
Light novels
Light novels first published online
Platinum Vision
Seven Seas Entertainment titles
Shōsetsuka ni Narō
Upcoming anime television series
Yuri (genre) anime and manga
Yuri (genre) light novels